Arkitekt is an Irish/British rock/electronica band. The group is a derivative from Mono Band.

Formation
While working with Mono Band, Noel Hogan (The Cranberries), received a track from the singer-songwriter, Richard Walters. Upon listening to the track, Hogan asked him to contribute to Mono Band. After recording and touring with Mono Band, they decided to continue working together and Arkitekt was born.

Line-up
 Noel Hogan – guitar, programming, backing vocals
 Richard Walters – vocals

Discography
EPs* The Black Hair
 14 Days

References

External links
Arkitekt official site
Gohan Records Noel Hogan's record label's website

Irish alternative rock groups
Irish electronic music groups
British electronic music groups
British rock music groups
Musical groups established in 2007